St Alban's Church in Macclesfield, Cheshire, England, is a Roman Catholic parish church.  The church is recorded in the National Heritage List for England as a designated Grade II* listed building.  It was designed by A. W. N. Pugin and is described as a "church of exceptional interest among the works of this major architect".

History
The church was designed in 1838 and built between 1839 and 1841.  Some of the money needed to build it was given by the Earl of Shrewsbury; the total cost was about £8,000.

Architecture

Exterior
The church is built in stone rubble with ashlar dressings and Welsh slate roof. Its plan consists of a west tower, a nave with a high clerestory, north and south aisles, a chancel, a south chapel, a south porch, and a vestry in the northeast angle.  Its style is Perpendicular.  The tower is unfinished.  Its west doorway is deeply moulded with a five-light window above it.  Above this is an arched light flanked by statues in niches. The tower has clasping buttresses and a stair turret in the southeast angle.  The aisles have five-light windows and in the clerestory are ten closely set two-light windows.  The east window has seven lights.

Interior
In the church the piers carrying the arcade are very slender.  At the entrance to the tower, the chancel and the chapel are tall, painted perpendicular arches.  In the tower are the organ and the choir gallery.  The chancel arch contains a rood screen.  On the screen are three 15th-century German figures that were coloured by Pugin.  The chancel has a coloured tile floor, a sedilia in the south wall, and an ornate altar piece with a statue in an aedicule over the tabernacle and 12 figures of saints on each side of it.  The altarpiece of the chapel consists of a statue in a niche flanked by panels depicting scenes from the life of Mary.  Another altar is at the east end of the north aisle.  The pulpit was added in 1854.  The pulpit, and the altarpiece in the chapel, were designed by E. W. Pugin and carved by Richard Hassall.  The stained glass in the east window is either by William Warrington or William Wailes to A. G. Pugin's design.  The south window in the chapel is dated 1846, is by Hardman, and also designed by Pugin.  The organ was built by Gray & Davison and moved to St Alban's from St Michael's Church, Macclesfield, in 1885.  It was rebuilt by the same firm in the 1910s.

See also

Grade II* listed buildings in Cheshire East
Listed buildings in Macclesfield

References

Roman Catholic churches in Cheshire
Grade II* listed churches in Cheshire
Churches completed in 1841
19th-century Roman Catholic church buildings in the United Kingdom
Gothic Revival church buildings in England
Gothic Revival architecture in Cheshire
Roman Catholic Diocese of Shrewsbury
Alban's Church